Eggert Munch (c.1685 – 2 September 1764) was a Norwegian painter. He was born in Vågå. Judged by his works, or works attributed to him, Munch is regarded among the most productive and important painters of Norwegian heritage in the 18th century, according to art historian Øivind Storm Bjerke. Among his works are altar pieces in churches in Halden, Vestre Toten, Torpa and Nordre Land.

References

1685 births
1764 deaths
People from Vågå
18th-century Norwegian painters
18th-century male artists
Norwegian male painters